Ferreira is a Portuguese and Galician surname, meaning "iron mine" (name of several locations in Portugal) but also the feminine of 'blacksmith'. People with the surname include:

General

A-E
 Abigail Izquierdo Ferreira (1922–2019), known as Bibi Ferreira, Brazilian actress, singer, and director
 Alexandre Rodrigues Ferreira (1756–1815), Portuguese naturalist
 Aloysio Nunes Ferreira (born 1945), Brazilian lawyer and politician
 Ana Gomes Ferreira (born 1987), Portuguese-born singer, musician, songwriter - known as "Ana Free"
 Anne Ferreira (born 1961), French politician
 António Ferreira (poet) (1528–1569), Portuguese poet and writer
 Augusto Barros Ferreira (1929-1998), Portuguese painter also known as Barros, and Augusto Barros
 Aurélio Buarque de Holanda Ferreira (1910–1989), Brazilian dictionarist and writer
 Barbara Linhares Ferreira (born 1996), American model and actress
 Ben Ferreira (born 1979), Canadian former competitive figure skater
 Benigno Ferreira (1846–1920), Paraguayan president
 Carlos Vaz Ferreira (1872–1958), Uruguayan philosopher, writer, and academic
 Carlos Alberto Ferreira Braga (1907–2006), Brazilian songwriter and occasional singer
 Carlota Ferreira (1838 – c. 1912), Uruguayan woman
 Cid Ferreira Gomes (born 1963), Brazilian politician, Senator for the state of Ceará
 Cristóvão Ferreira (1580–1650), Portuguese Jesuit missionary to Japan who became an apostate
 David Mourão-Ferreira (1927–1996), Portuguese writer and poet
 Edemar Cid Ferreira (born 1943), Brazilian economist and former head of Banco Santos
 Elisa Ferreira (born 1955), Portuguese politician, current vice-governor of the Bank of Portugal
 Enéas Ferreira Carneiro (1938–2007), Brazilian cardiologist, founder of the Party of the Reconstruction of the National Order

F-J
 Fátima Ferreira (born 1959), Brazilian biologist and biochemist
 Francisco Ferreira Drummond (1796–1858), Portuguese historiographer, paleographer, musician and politician
 Francisco Joaquim Ferreira do Amaral (1843–1923),  Portuguese naval commander and politician
 Gabriel Arcanjo Ferreira da Costa (born 1954), Prime Minister of São Tomé and Príncipe (2012-2014)
 Gerrit Ferreira (born 1948), South African businessman
 Hendrik C. Ferreira, South-African professor, digital communications and Information Theory
 Hugo Ferreira (born 1974), Angolan-born Portuguese-American singer, songwriter and musician
 Ignatius Ferreira (1840-1921), South African soldier, fortune hunter and gold miner
 Ignatius Stephanus Ferreira ("Naas Ferreira", 1844-1900), Second Boer War general
 Jesús Reyes Ferreira (1880–1977), self-taught artist and antiques/art collector and vendor
 Joachim Johannes Ferreira (1835–1917), a Boer commandant of the First Boer War. 
 Gilmar Ferreira Mendes (born 1955), Brazilian judge of the Supremo Tribunal Federal 
 João Ferreira (politician) (born 1978), Portuguese biologist and former member of the European Parliament 
 João Ferreira Franco Pinto Castelo-Branco (1855–1929), Portuguese 43rd Minister for Treasury Affairs and 73rd Prime Minister
 João Maria Ferreira do Amaral (1803–1849), Portuguese military officer and governor of Macau
 Joaquim Ferreira de Mello, Roman Catholic Archbishop of Pelotas (1921–1940)
 José Dias Ferreira (1837–1909), Portuguese lawyer, politician and jurist, son of António Ferreira Dias
 José dos Santos Ferreira (1919–1993), known as "Adé", Portuguese-Macanese poet
 Jose Fernando Ferreira Mendes (born 1962), Portuguese statistical physicist on the field of network theory
 José Maria Ferreira de Castro (1898–1974), Portuguese writer and journalist
 José Ribamar Ferreira de Araújo Costa (born 1930), Brazilian lawyer and writer, 31st President of Brazil
 José Vicente Concha Ferreira (1869–1929), President of Colombia from 1914 to 1918

L-V
 Laurence Ferreira Barbosa (born 1958), French film director and screenwriter
 Lopo Fortunato Ferreira do Nascimento (born 1942), Prime Minister of Angola (1975–78), and Secretary-General of the MPLA Party
 Louis Ferreira, Portuguese Canadian actor
 Luís Ferreira Filipe Vieira (born 1949), Portuguese real estate businessman
 Maria Adelaide Mengas Matafome Ferreira (born 1959), Portuguese singer
 María Eugenia Vaz Ferreira (1875–1924), Uruguayan teacher and poet
 Matheus Silva Ferreira da Costa (born 1987), Brazilian football manager
 Nadia Ferreira (born 1999), Paraguayan model
 Paul Ferreira (born 1973), Canadian populist politician
 R.A.P. Ferreira (born 1992), American rapper and producer
 Sérgio Henrique Ferreira (born 1934), Brazilian pharmacologist
 Sky Ferreira (born 1992), singer
 Teresa Simões-Ferreira Heinz (born 1938),  Portuguese-American businesswoman and philanthropist
 Vergílio Ferreira (1916–1996), Portuguese writer
 Virgulino Ferreira da Silva (1897–1938), known as Lampião, the leader of the Cangaço, a banditry of the Brazilian Northeast

Sportspeople 
 Abel Fernando Moreira Ferreira (born 1978), Portuguese retired football right back
 Adenízia Ferreira da Silva (born 1986), Brazilian volleyball middle blocker 
 Adhemar Ferreira da Silva (1927–2001), Brazilian triple jumper
 Adriano Ferreira (born 1974), former professional tennis player from Brazil
 Ailton Ferreira Silva, Brazilian professional football left-back 
 Aldemir dos Santos Ferreira (born 1997), Brazilian footballer
 Alessandro Ferreira Leonardo (born  1987), commonly known as Sandro, Hong Kong football player 
 Alexandre Ferreira (fighter), Brazilian professional mixed martial artist
 Alison Lopes Ferreira (born 1993), Brazilian football defensive midfielder
 Andries Stephanus Ferreira (born 1990), South African rugby unionplayer
 Amber Ferreira (born 1982), American triathlete, coach, and endurance athlete 
 Andre Ferreira Teixeira (born 1993), Portuguese football right back
 André Filipe Ferreira Coelho Pereira (born 1995), Portuguese professional football forward
 Bismark de Araújo Ferreira (born 1993), Brazilian football winger
 Carlos Diego Ferreira (born 1985), Brazilian mixed martial artist
 Carlos Eduardo Ferreira Batista (born 1992), known as Kakà, Portuguese football left back
 Carlos Eduardo Ferreira de Souza (born 1996), known as Carlos Eduardo, Brazilian football forward
 Claudemir Ferreira da Silva (born 1984), Brazilian footballer 
 Douglas Ferreira (footballer) (born 1986), Brazilian footballer
 Edvaldo Ferreira (born 1990), Angolan handball player
 Elizeu Antônio Ferreira Vinagre Godoy (born 1945), Brazilian former footballer 
 Emerson Ferreira (born 1976), Brazilian football defensive midfielder
 Emerson Ferreira da Rosa (born 1976), known as "Emerson", Brazilian footballer
 Eusébio da Silva Ferreira (1942–2014), Portuguese footballer
 Evander da Silva Ferreira (born 1998), Brazilian football attacking midfielder
 Evanílson Aparecido Ferreira (born1975), Brazilian retired footballer
 Everaldo Ferreira Magalhaes (born 1982), Brazilian soccer player
 Fábio Miguel Lourenço Ferreira (born 1989), Portuguese professional footballer
 Filipe Miguel Neves Ferreira (born 1990), Portuguese footballer 
 Francisco Ferreira (footballer, born 1997), known as Ferro, Portuguese professional football centre-back
 Frederico Ferreira Silva, Portuguese tennis player
 Gabriel Vasconcelos Ferreira (born 1992), Brazilian footballer
 Gonçalo Nuno Borges Ferreira Gomes Alves (born 1977), Portuguese futsal defender
 Guilherme Ferreira Pinto (born 1992), Brazilian footballer 
 Hélder José Castro Ferreira (born 1997), Portuguese professional football left winger
 Heron Ferreira (born 1958), known as Heron, Brazilian professional football manager
 Hugo Miguel Ferreira Gomes Viana (born 1983), Portuguese retired professional football central midfielder
 Hugo Ventura Ferreira Moura Guedes (born 1988), Portuguese football goalkeeper
 Italo Ferreira (born 1994), Brazilian professional surfer 
 Ivo Daniel Ferreira Mendonça Pinto (born 1990), Portuguese professional football right back
 Jacksen Ferreira Tiago (born 1968), Brazilian retired footballer
 Jael Ferreira (born 1988), Brazilian football striker 
 Jesualdo Ferreira (born 1946), Portuguese football coach
 Jesús Ferreira (born 2000), Colombian-born American soccer player 
 João António Ferreira Resende Alves (born 1952), Portuguese former footballer and coach
 Joaquim Rodrigues Ferreira (born unknown-deceased), former Portuguese footballer who played as defender.
 Jorge Isaac Baltazar Ferreira (born 1982), known as "Jorge Baltazar", Mexican squash player
 Jorge Ferreira da Silva (born 1967), retired Brazilian footballer
 José Albano Ferreira Mota (born 1964), Portuguese retired football right back
 Jose Carlos Ferreira Filho (born 1983), known as Zè Carlos, Brazilian professional football striker
 José Ferreira Neto (born 1966), known as "Neto", Brazilian footballer
 Jose Marcelo Ferreira (born 1973), known as Zè Maria, retired Brazilian football player and was manager
 Jose Ferreira Franco (1934–2009), Brazilian former football (soccer) player
 José Leandro de Souza Ferreira (born 1959), Brazilian former football defender
 José Nadson Ferreira (born 1984), known as Nadson, Brazilian football centre-back 
 Júlio Alexandre Bacelar Oliveira Ferreira (born 1994), Portuguese taekwondo practitioner
 Kepler Laveran Lima Ferreira (born 1983), Portuguese professional footballer in the role of centre back
 Leonardo Ferreira da Silva (born 1980), Brazilian football striker
 Lucimar Ferreira da Silva (born 1978), Brazilian football central defender
 Luiz Carlos Ferreira (born 1958), known as Luizinho, Brazilian former footballer 
 Luis de Souza Ferreira (1908–2008), Peruvian football forward player
 Lula Ferreira (born 1951), Brazilian basketball coach
 Mádson Ferreira dos Santos (born 1992), Brazilian football right back 
 Manuel Ferreira (footballer) (1905–1983), an Argentine footballer
 Manuel José Ferreira da Silva Barbosa (born 1951), Portuguese football manager and a former player
 Mara Ferreira Leão (born 1991), Brazilian volleyball player 
 Marcelo Augusto Ferreira Teixeira (born 1987), Brazilian professional football defender
 Marcelo Ferreira (born 1965), Brazilian sailor and Olympic champion
 Marcelo Ferreira Martins (born 1975), Brazilian and naturalized Honduran former football player
 Marcelo Oliveira Ferreira (born 1987), Brazilian professional footballer
 Márcio Rafael Ferreira de Souza (born 1985), known as Rafinha, Brazilian football right back 
 Marcio Ferreira Nobre (born 1980), known as Mert Nobre, Brazilian origin Turkish former football striker
 Marco Ferreira (born 1978), Portuguese footballer
 Marco Júlio Castanheira Afonso Alves Ferreira (born 1978), retired Portuguese football winger
 Maria Conceição da Costa Ferreira (born 1962), retired Portuguese long-distance runner
 Mariano Ferreira Filho (born 1986), Brazilian professional football right back
 Martin Ferreira (born 1989), South African rugby union player
 Michael Ferreira (born 1938), Indian player of English billiards
 Miguel Ferreira de Almeida (born 1949), Brazilian footballer
 Monique Ferreira (born 1980), Brazilian freestyle swimmer
 Neil Ferreira (born 1979), Zimbabwean cricketer
 Nelson Ferreira (footballer) (born 1982), Swiss and Portuguese footballer
 Nílton Ferreira Júnior (born 1987), simply known as Nílton, Brazilian football defensive midfielder
 Nivaldo Rodrigues Ferreira (born 1988), Brazilian football midfielder 
 Paulo Ferreira (born 1979), Portuguese footballer
 Quentin Ferreira (born 1972), South African cricketer
 Rafael Alexandre Fernandes Ferreira Silva (born 1993), Portuguese football attacking midfielder
 Raimundo Ferreira Ramos (born 1970), known as Júnior Baiano, retired Brazilian football defender
 Raúl Fragoso Ferreira Duarte (born 1963), Angolan basketball coach
 Reginaldo Ferreira (born 1983), Brazilian professional football player
 Ricardo Ferreira da Silva (born 1984), Brazilian professional football left back
 Ricardo Jorge Ferreira Pinto da Silva (born 1980), Cape Verdean professional football central defender or right back
 Ricardo José Araújo Ferreira (born 1992), Portuguese professional football central defender
 Ricardo Manuel Ferreira Sousa (born 1981), known as Cadú, Portuguese professional football central defender
 Rivaldo Vítor Borba Ferreira Júnior (born 1995), known as Rivaldinho, is a Brazilian professional football forward
 Rogério Moraes Ferreira (born 1994), Brazilian handball player
 Rolando Ferreira Júnior (born 1964), retired Brazilian professional basketball player and coach
 Rúben Rafael Sousa Ferreira (born 1990), Portuguese professional footballer
 Schalk Jakobus Petrus Ferreira (born 1984), South African rugby union player
 Sebastián Ferreira Vidal (born 1998), Paraguayan football player 
 Silvio (Silvio Manuel Azevedo Ferreira Sá Pereira) (born 1987), Portuguese professional football defender
 Tânia Ferreira (born 1974), Brazilian judoka
 Teófilo Ferreira (born 1973), Brazilian freestyle swimmer
 Thiago Heleno Henrique Ferreira Iborn 1988), brazilian football central defender
 Tiago Ferreira (born 1975), known as "Tiago", Portuguese footballer
 Tiago Ferreira (born 1993), Portuguese footballer
 Vicente Ferreira Pastinha (1889–1981), mestre  of the Brazilian martial art Capoeira
 Victor Ramos Ferreira (born 1989), Brazilian football central defender
 Virgilio Ferreira Romero (born 1973), retired Paraguayan football midfielder
 Vítor Borba Ferreira (born 1972), known as Rivaldo, Brazilian former professional footballer
 Wágner Ferreira dos Santos (born 1985), Brazilian football player
 Wanderson Ferreira de Oliveira (born 1984), known as Valdívia, Brazilian football attacking midfielder
 Wayne Ferreira (born 1971), South African tennis player
 Wesley Moraes Ferreira Da Silva (born 1996), Brazilian professional football centre forward
 William Ferreira Martínez (born 1983), Uruguayan football striker
 Yannick Ferreira Carrasco (born 1993), Belgian footballer

Fictional
 Ferreira family, fictional Asian family in EastEnders

See also 
 Marquis of Ferreira, Portuguese title of nobility created by a royal decree in 1533
 Herrera (surname), a related Spanish surname
 Laferrière (surname), a related French surname
 Ferreyra, Ferreiro, Ferrero, Ferrer, Ferraro, similar Italian-origin surnames also meaning 'smith'

Portuguese-language surnames
Galician-language surnames